Georgios Niklitsiotis (born 23 March 1991) is a Greek professional footballer who plays as an attacking midfielder.

Club career
Niklitsiotis started his football steps from Olympiacos Academy and was promoted to Olympiacos Reserve squad (U-21) the season 2007–2008. He gained his first professional cap against Larissa, on 12 April 2009. He played for 52 minutes before Luciano Galletti replaced him.

International career
Niklitsiotis was a member of the Greece U-19 national team.

He was part of the youth team that went to Dubai to compete for the first Emirates Airlines football 7's exhibition event. He scored a host of goals and lead Olympiakos to the professional cup and was named player of the tournament.

Honours
 Greek Superleague: 2009

References

External links
Soccerway Profile
Myplayer Profile

1991 births
Living people
Greek footballers
Greek expatriate footballers
Super League Greece players
Eerste Divisie players
Olympiacos F.C. players
OFI Crete F.C. players
Thrasyvoulos F.C. players
Helmond Sport players
PAS Giannina F.C. players
Niki Volos F.C. players
Expatriate footballers in the Netherlands
Aittitos Spata F.C. players
Association football midfielders
Footballers from Trikala